Visa requirements for Andorra citizens are administrative entry restrictions by the authorities of other states placed on citizens of Andorra. As of 2 July 2019, Andorran citizens had visa-free or visa on arrival access to 166 countries and territories, ranking the Andorran passport 21st in terms of travel freedom according to the Henley Passport Index.

Visa requirements map

Visa requirements

Dependent, disputed, or restricted territories

Visa requirements for Andorran citizens for visits to various territories, disputed areas, partially recognized countries and restricted zones:

Non-visa restrictions

See also

 Visa policy of Andorra
 Visa policy of the Schengen Area
 Andorran passport
 Foreign relations of Andorra

Notes

References

Andorra
Foreign relations of Andorra